The 1st Curtis Cup Match was played on 21 May 1932 at Wentworth Golf Club in Virginia Water, Surrey, England. The United States won 5 to 3.

The match was played on the East course, measuring about 6,000 yards. The foursomes began at 10:30 am and the singles at 2 pm. All the match pairings were announced the previous day. Britain used all 8 of their players while the Americans used the same six in both sessions. The United States won all three foursomes matches and, although Britain did better in the afternoon, America won two singles matches and won the contest.

Format
The contest was played in a single day, with three foursomes in the morning and six singles matches in the afternoon, a total of 9 points.

Each of the 9 matches was worth one point in the larger team competition. If a match was all square after the 18th hole extra holes were not played. Rather, each side earned  a point toward their team total. The team that accumulated at least 5 points won the competition.

Teams
Eight players for Great Britain & Ireland and USA participated in the event. Both teams had a playing captain, although the American captain, Marion Hollins, was one of the two reserves.

The American reserves, Marion Hollins and Dorothy Higbie, did not play in any matches.

Morning foursomes

Afternoon singles

References

Curtis Cup
Golf tournaments in England
International sports competitions hosted by England
Sport in Surrey
Curtis Cup
Curtis Cup
Curtis Cup